The Küçük Hasan Pasha Mosque or Yalı Mosque (from ) is a former Ottoman mosque and exhibition hall in Chania, Crete, Greece.

History
The building was originally constructed as a mosque after the conquest of Chania by Ottoman Empire in 1645 to honor Küçük Hasan Pasha. After the Greco-Turkish population exchange in 1923, the mosque ceased to function and in 1939 its minarets were demolished. During World War II, it housed the Archaeological Museum of Chania. Later on, it was used as storehouse, folklore museum, visitor center and exhibition hall.

See also
 Islam in Greece
 Ottoman Crete

References

1645 establishments in the Ottoman Empire
Buildings and structures in Chania
Former mosques in Greece
Mosques completed in 1645
Religious buildings and structures in Crete
Mosque buildings with domes
Ottoman architecture in Crete
17th-century architecture in Greece